The Two Castles Trail is a waymarked long distance footpath in Devon and Cornwall, England.

The trail passes through the villages of Bridestowe, Lewdown and Lifton.  Between Okehampton and Bridestowe, the trail coincides with the West Devon Way.

External links

 Explore Devon

Long-distance footpaths in England
Footpaths in Cornwall
Footpaths in Devon